Xutu Gang Station is a station of Line 2, Suzhou Rail Transit. The station is located in Xiangcheng District of Suzhou. It started service on December 28, 2013, the same time of the operation of Line 2.

Bus Connections
Connection Bus Stops:Cailian Transportation Center, North Cailian Transportation Center, East Xiangcheng Hospital, YuanHeZhiChun, Xiangcheng Hospital

Connection Bus Routes: 3, Ye4 (Night Route), 5, 7, 77, 78, 83, 801, 802, 805, 807, 808, 809, 810, 812, 814, 818, 825, 832

References

Railway stations in Jiangsu
Suzhou Rail Transit stations
Railway stations in China opened in 2013